The 2018–19 Saint Louis Billikens men's basketball team represented Saint Louis University in the 2018–19 NCAA Division I men's basketball season. Their head coach was Travis Ford in his third season at Saint Louis. The team played their home games at Chaifetz Arena as a member of the Atlantic 10 Conference. They finished the season 23–13, 10–8 in A-10 play to finish in a tie for sixth place. They defeated Richmond, Dayton, Davidson and St. Bonaventure to be champions of the A-10 tournament. They received the A-10's automatic bid to the NCAA tournament where they lost in the first round to Virginia Tech.

Previous season 
The Billikens finished the 2017–18 season 17–16, 9–9 in A-10 play to finish in a four-way tie for fifth place. As the No. 6 seed in the A-10 tournament, they defeated George Washington in the second round before losing to Davidson in the quarterfinals.

Offseason

Departures

Incoming transfers

2018 recruiting class

Preseason 
At the Atlantic 10 Media Day, the Billikens was picked to win the Atlantic 10 in the league's annual preseason poll. Also, senior guard Javon Bess and sophomore guard Jordan Goodwin were named preseason second-team All-Conference, while sophomore forward Hasahn French was named to the third team. Bess landed on the league's preseason All-Defensive team as well.

Roster 
On January 3, 2019, after appearing in 13 games, Carte'Are Gordon was granted his release from his scholarship and left the team. After appearing in two games, Ingvi Þór Guðmundsson withdrew from school and left the team on January 21, 2019.

Source

Schedule and results
 
|-
!colspan=9 style=| Exhibition

|-
!colspan=9 style=| Non-conference Regular season

|-
!colspan=12 style=| A-10 Regular Season
|-

|-
!colspan=9 style=| A-10 tournament

|-
!colspan=12 style=| NCAA tournament
|-
</span>

Source

References

Saint Louis
Saint Louis Billikens men's basketball seasons
Saint
Saint
Saint Louis